Rui Duarte is the name of:
Rui Duarte (footballer born 1978), Rui Pedro Viegas Silva Gomes Duarte, Portuguese football midfielder
Rui Duarte (footballer born 1980), Rui Sandro de Carvalho Duarte, Portuguese football defender
Rui Duarte (pentathlete) (born 1911), Brazilian modern pentathlete